Protomelas similis is a species of cichlid endemic to Lake Malawi where it prefers shallow waters with plentiful vegetation.  This species can reach a length of  TL.  This species can also be found in the aquarium trade.

References

External links 
 Photograph

similis
Fish described in 1922
Taxonomy articles created by Polbot